Kim Woo-seok may refer to:

Kim Woo-seok (actor), South Korean actor
Kim Woo-seok (footballer), South Korean footballer
Kim Woo-seok (singer), UP10TION and X1 member